Hekimoğlu (died 1913) was full name Hekimoğlu İbrahim, Ottoman Turkish outlaw and folk hero.

Hekimoğlu is also the name of:

 Hekimoğlu Ali Pasha (1689–1758), Ottoman grand vizier and statesman
 Bahattin Hekimoğlu (born 1989), Turkish para archer
 Mahmut Hekimoğlu (1955–2016), Turkish actor and film producer

Turkish-language surnames